Manyiel Wugol (born 24 January 1999) is a South Sudanese-Australian basketball player who plays for Florida National University of the National Association of Intercollegiate Athletics

Early life 
Manyiel Wugol was born in Rumbek, South Sudan. His family fled the war-torn South Sudan and escaped to Kakuma refugee camp where they waited to be granted their visas and immigrated to Perth, Australia when he was two years old.

Wugol started playing basketball at the late age of 16, growing up he mainly took interest in soccer, australian rules football and boxing. Wugol attended Caramarr Primary School and Thomas Carr College for high school. Wugol was drawn to basketball due to his older brother and cousins playing the game. His family relocated from Perth to Melbourne and he grew a large interest in basketball.

High school career 
Wugol attended Lake Joondalup Baptist College in Perth from year 7 to year 9. He transferred to Thomas Carr College when his family moved to Melbourne. In his first year on the varsity squad, He led the team to a championship in the Association of Co-educational School (ACS) basketball winter league.

Wugol played his grassroots basketball for South Sudanese basketball club Perth Rhinos and Melbourne based Longhorns, who has produced many South Sudanese-Australian college and professional players .

in 2017, two years after he started playing the game of basketball he enrolled at Believe prep in Athens, Tennessee on an athletic scholarship.

College career

Southwestern Community College (2019–2021)
In August 2019, Wugol signed to Southwestern Community College who compete in the Iowa Community College Athletic Conference. Wugol made his college debut on November 1 against Independence Community College.

Long Beach State (2021)
On 3 June, Wugol Committed to  Long Beach State Beach program. but failed to get academically eligible to play for the Beach.

ASA College (2021-2022)
Wugol attended ASA college after not being academically eligible at Long Beach State. He appeared in 13 games making 6 starts, averaging 6.0 points per game with a season high of 18 points.

Florida National University (2022)
Wugol signed with the Florida National Conquistadors program. He only appeared in 1 game before making the decision to turn professional.

Personal life 
Wugol has 3 brothers and 5 sisters. He is a descendant of the Dinka tribe of South Sudan. Wugol is the cousin of basketball players Makur Maker and Thon Maker.

References

External links 
 Southwestern Spartans bio

Living people
1999 births
Australian men's basketball players
Australian expatriate basketball people in the United States
Australian people of South Sudanese descent
Sportspeople of South Sudanese descent
Shooting guards
Small forwards
Basketball players from Perth, Western Australia